Godwin Agbevor (born 19 February 2003) is a Ghanaian footballer who currently plays as a midfielder for Ghana Premier League side WAFA.

Career 
Agbevor started his career with West African Football Academy in August 2020. With the league set to restart, he was named on the club's squad list for the 2020–21 season. On 10 April 2019, during his debut match he scored his debut goal in the 46th minute in a 4–3 home victory over King Faisal Babes. He played the full 90 minutes of the match.

References

External links 
 

Living people
2003 births
Association football midfielders
Ghanaian footballers
West African Football Academy players
Ghana Premier League players